La Faille (English: The Flaw) or The Wall (French: Le Mur) is a French Canadian television crime drama series of three seasons, with a total of 25 episodes, which started broadcasting on Club Illico in 2019. The first season of eight episodes was broadcast in Canada from December 12, 2019 and in France as The Wall: Cover Your Tracks from April 26, 2020 via 13ème Rue. The second season, La Faille 2 or The Wall: The Chateau Murder (French: Le meurtre du château), of nine episodes was broadcast from October 17, 2021. La Faille 3, the third and final season of eight episodes, was aired on November 16, 2022.

The first season is set in the mining town of Fermont, north-eastern Quebec, Canada. Fermont's major structural feature is popularly known as the Wall, which comprises self-contained residential, commercial, recreational and educational buildings. In La Faille the main protagonist, detective sergeant Céline (Isabel Richer), is sent from provincial capital Quebec City to investigate the murder of a stripper-prostitute, inside the Wall. Assisting Céline is local uniformed policeman Alex (Alexandre Landry). Céline encounters her estranged daughter Sophie (Maripier Morin) who is married to the mine-owner's son Lou (Jean-Philippe Perras). In France season one's broadcasting was halted in mid-July 2020 when French-Canadian singer-songwriter Safia Nolin aired allegations of sexual assault and racist statements by Morin. Morin publicly apologized, Nolin did not lodge any official complaint and the artistic community pressured Club Illico so that broadcasting was resumed.

During the second season, Céline is back in Quebec City and investigates the murder of a civil engineer – found encased in concrete in a Château Frontenac bathroom. Alex, on compulsory leave for post-traumatic stress disorder, unofficially investigates the case, going undercover at the château. Sophie joins her father William (Bruno Verdoni) to hunt industrial secrets related to the city's major engineering projects. Céline is partnered with rookie detective Daphne (Naila Louidort). Before filming of the third season began, Morin was removed from the cast, after further allegations of inappropriate behavior had been raised. For Faille 3 Céline is dispatched to her fictitious hometown of Applegrove in Eastern Townships (or Estrie). Alex had responded to a skeleton found in Applegrove, which is identified as Céline's long-missing grandmother. Céline and Alex are joined by Estrie police officer, Johnny. The squad becomes enmeshed in long-lasting feuds between three local families. Complications increase when the squad finds a link to the abbey of Saint-Benoît-du-Lac.

Cast 

Credits:
 Isabel Richer as Céline Trudeau: Quebec City-based Sûreté du Québec (SQ, English: Provincial Police Force of Quebec) detective sergeant, 48-years-old, born in Washington, raised in Applegrove, mother of Sophie, ex-wife of William
 Alexandre Landry as Alexandre (Alex) Théberge: Fermont policeman, assists Céline, married to Fabienne, later moves to Quebec City, diagnosed with post-traumatic stress disorder
 Maripier Morin as Sophie Taylor: Ricard Mine's communications officer, married to Lou, Celine's estranged daughter, later returns to Quebec City, resumes contact with her father, William
 David Savard as Martin Landry: SQ medical examiner, Celine's friend
 Benoît Gouin as Jacques Larocque: SQ commander, Céline's boss, political appointee

Season 1 additional cast 

Credits:
  as Louis-Philippe (Lou) Ricard: Ricard Mine's director, son of Jules and Diane, Sophie's husband
 Patrick Hivon as Bruno Lamontagne: mine worker, Justine's regular customer, angry and violent father of Anthony and Grégoire (died), Nathalie's ex-husband
 Éveline Gélinas as Nathalie St-Onge: Bruno's ex-wife, Anthony and Grégoire's mother
 Xavier Huard as Alain Turgeon: Fermont police researcher, Nathalie's lover
 Marc Messier as Jules Ricard: Ricard Mine's owner and Fermont's main employer, married to Diane, Lou's father
 Élise Guilbault as Diane Tremblay-Ricard: Fermont mayor, Ricard's wife, Lou's mother
 Stéphane F. Jacques as Marc Desautel: Fermont police lieutenant, Alex and Geneviève's boss
 Alexa-Jeanne Dube as Geneviève Bédard: Fermont crime scene analyst, Alex' co-worker
 Noah Parker as Anthony Lamontagne: Bruno and Nathalie's elder son, Grégoire's brother
 Marianne Fortier as Raphaëlle Fournier: Justine's younger sister, Anthony's girlfriend
 Denis Trudel as Robert Fournier: mining engineer, Claude's brother, Justine and Raphaëlle's uncle
 Kim Despatis as Fabienne Dubé: Fermont paramedic, Alex's wife, murdered
 Catherine St-Laurent as Léa Valois: Fertek bartender, Justine's friend
 Vincent Kim as Pao Beauchemin: mine worker, Diane's clandestine lover
  as Dave Bélanger: Fermont computer, phone and electronics store owner, murdered
  as Hélène Fournier: Justine and Raphaëlle's mother, Claude's wife
 Normand Daoust as Claude Fournier: Justine and Raphaëlle's father, married to Hélène
 Mélanie Langlais as Justine Fournier: stripper-prostitute, murdered
 Kim Lavack as Jérôme: Fermont paramedic, Fabienne's co-worker, murdered
 Monique Spaziani as Suzanne Desmarais: mother of murdered Steven Desmarais
 Schelby Jean-Baptiste as Fanette Jasmin: Fermont news reporter, works for Diane

Season 2 additional cast 

Credits:
 Naila Louidort as Daphné Constant: rookie SQ detective, mentored by Céline 
 Bruno Verdoni as William Taylor: Céline's ex-husband, speculator, industrial spy, father of Sophie
 Marie Bernier as Sylvie Cadieux: Château Frontenac concierge, Nathan's friend
 Felix-Antoine Duval as Adrien Lacombe: château bellhop, steals from guests, mentors Alex
 Jean Marchand as Hubert Philippin: civil engineer, pled guilty and served time for bridge collapse; researched better construction materials, murdered
 Romane Denis as Joanie Prévost: medical student, bridge collapse survivor, daughter of Samuel, elder sister of dead Felix, stays at château
 Genevieve Boivin-Roussy as Esther Smith: Montréal university lecturer, civil engineer, hired to recommend Quebec's "third link", Hubert's research assistant and lover, murdered
 Bruno Marcil as Samuel Prévost: Joanie's father, won prize of a week's stay at château, assaulted Hubert, fled when under suspicion
 Émile Schneider as Nathan Gignac: tourist taxi driver, friend of Joanie, his sister Anne died in bridge collapse
 Manuel Tadros as Edmond Chamfort: major builder, coerced Hubert into accepting all guilt for collapsed bridge, schemes to recover his reputation, Bernard's father, murdered
 Charles-Aubey Houde as Bernard Chamfort: building contractor, Edmond's son
 Julian Casey as Geoff Peterson: wealthy businessman, owns Château Frontenac, owns construction business, his wife Anne (Nathan's sister) died in bridge collapse
 Amélie Grenier as Patricia Fleury: Joanie's mother, Samuel's wife
  as Esposito: SQ uniformed police in Céline's squad room
  as Monique Desjardins: deputy minister of transport

Filming 

Season one was shot mainly in Fermont, some segments were filmed in Saint-Zénon or Terrebonne. Several interior scenes were shot in a disused shopping centre in Saint-Hubert, the Complexe Cousineau. Others were filmed in Quebec City.

Episode guide

Season 1

Season 2

Season 3

References

External links
 
 
 

2019 Canadian television series debuts
2022 Canadian television series endings
2010s Canadian crime drama television series
2020s Canadian crime drama television series
French-language television shows
English-language television shows
Television shows set in Quebec
Club Illico original programming
MBC 4 series